The Talent Given Us is a 2004 film by Andrew Wagner. Most of the cast is Wagner's own family.

Roger Ebert praised The Talent Given Us as "one of the most original, daring, intriguing, and honest films of the year," while 2004 CineVegas juror Wendy Mitchell, writing about the film for indieWIRE last year, said that the movie "could qualify as the bravest movie I have ever seen." It was later named to indieWIRE's list of the best films of 2004 without distribution.

References

External links
 
 

2004 films
2004 comedy films
American comedy films
2000s English-language films
2000s American films